Royston/Roystonhill is a district in the Scottish city of Glasgow. It is situated north of the River Clyde. It was previously known as Garngad and is still known as such by residents with a familial link to the area. It is notable for its large population of immigrants, mostly of Irish Catholic descent, with an annual St Patrick's Day Festival.

There are few vestiges of the old Roystonhill in evidence these days other than a few street names, some street having succumbed to development. The church steeple has been converted into a tower monument and the church hall carries on its service as a local community centre. The former convent has been relocated in the Robroyston area. The previous stigma of deprivation earned in its slum years, has largely been shed with the recent program of newbuild housing and renovations to social housing.

The local secondary school and football team are both named after Saint Roch.

A former Member of Parliament (MP) for the area, Michael Martin, was Speaker of the House of Commons from 2000 to 2009. During his tenure, the UK parliamentary expenses scandal occurred.

The social club for Catholic community was traditionally known as the 'Hibs Hall'. The Hall was sold by the Ancient Order of Hibernians in 1969 to St. Roch's RC Parish before being sold to a local private concern and renamed "The Huddle Club". The club was burnt down in a fire in the early 21st century.

Royston was the venue for street parties celebrating Celtic F.C. League wins in 1997/98 and 2000/01. The first street party was a semi-planned, semi-impromptu gathering along the Royston Road which became the inspiration for the second street party. The street party of 2000/01 was much more professionally planned and included a stage with live music as well as murals being painted and a video produced to mark the event. There was controversy surrounding this event as the council has never arranged or permitted any such event for Celtic's rivals, Rangers F.C. from across the River Clyde.

Notable residents
Stevie Chalmers, footballer
Louie Deadlife, rapper
Jim Forrest, footballer
George Gallacher, singer
Jimmy McGrory, footballer
Kevin Rutkiewicz, footballer

See also
 Glasgow tower blocks

References

External links
 Royston Road Project
 Spire View Housing Association
Royston Community Social Networking Site
 Life Link Glasgow (Formerly Royston Stress Centre)

Areas of Glasgow
Irish diaspora in Scotland
Springburn